Khiyakh is a rural locality (a selo) in Tsakhurskoye Rural Settlement, Rutulsky District, Republic of Dagestan, Russia. The population was 56 as of 2010. There is 1 street.

Geography 
Khiyakh is located on the Samur river, 34 km northwest of Rutul (the district's administrative centre) by road. Tsakhur and Gelmets are the nearest rural localities.

Nationalities 
Tsakhurs live there.

Famous residents 
 Shakhban Mamedov (Minister of Agriculture of the DASSR)

References 

Rural localities in Rutulsky District